Ente Shabdham is a 1986 Indian Malayalam film, directed by V. K. Unnikrishnan. The film stars Jagathy Sreekumar, Ratheesh, Madhuri and Seema in the lead roles. The film has musical score by A. T. Ummer.

Cast
Jagathy Sreekumar as Vasu
Ratheesh as Rajan
Madhuri
Seema
T. G. Ravi as Thambi
Raveendran as Sivan
 T. R. Omana
 Santhosh as Abu
 Jose as Vijay
 Sabitha Anand as Laila
 Ramu as Sudhakaran
 Vijayan as Police Officer

Soundtrack
The music was composed by A. T. Ummer and the lyrics were written by Poovachal Khader.

References

External links
 

1986 films
1980s Malayalam-language films